K/T line may refer to:
 The K/T boundary or the Cretaceous–Paleogene boundary, a geological signature that defines the end of the Mesozoic era.
 The K Ingleside line and the T Third Street line of San Francisco's Muni Metro light rail system, which are spliced together through the city's downtown and operate as one line.